The Battle of Oriola was an armed conflict fought between the troops of the Agermanats (members of the Revolt of the Brotherhoods), mainly artisan guilds, and those of Pedro Fajardo y Chacón, Marqués de los Vélez, on 30 August 1521 in Oriola (Orihuela), in the Kingdom of Valencia (now in Spain).

The events were marked by strong internal disputes amongst the Agermanats (members of the Revolt of the Brotherhoods), which were divided between moderates and radicals. This led to a significant decline in their forces, just over a month after the Battle of Gandia.

The defeat of the Germanias was crucial to the Revolt of the Brotherhoods. It killed more than 2,000 men and was accompanied by a major crackdown, with the execution of forty Agermanado. As a result, the southern Kingdom of Valencia, from Alicante to Ontinyent, fell into royalist hands

Revolt of the Brotherhoods
History of the province of Alicante
Battles of the Early Modern period
Battles involving Spain
16th century in Spain
1521 in Europe
1521 in Spain
Conflicts in 1521